Iván Garrido may refer to:
Iván Garrido (footballer, born 1981)
Iván Garrido (footballer, born 1990)